Bolton is an unincorporated area and census-designated place (CDP) in Stark County, Ohio, United States. It was first listed as a CDP prior to the 2020 census.

The CDP is in northeastern Stark County, in central Lexington Township. It is bordered to the south by the city of Alliance. U.S. Route 62T, a freeway bypass of Alliance, forms the border between Bolton and Alliance and leads southwest  to Canton. Ohio State Route 183 (Iowa Avenue) forms the northeast edge of Bolton and leads north  to Atwater. State Route 619 (Edison Street) leaves Route 183 in the center of Bolton and leads west  to Hartville.

Bolton is bordered to the west by Beech Creek, a north-flowing tributary of the Mahoning River, which flows through Youngstown to the Beaver River in Pennsylvania.

Demographics

References 

Census-designated places in Stark County, Ohio
Census-designated places in Ohio